Boxing News is a British weekly boxing magazine published by Kelsey Media. It is the longest-running boxing magazine still in publication, dating back to 1909.

History
Boxing News was founded in 1909 by original editor John Murray as, simply, Boxing. Murray had been a regular contributor to Health & Strength magazine and convinced its owner, Bill Berry (later Lord Camrose) to launch a weekly magazine dedicated solely to boxing. It is believed Murray had been inspired by Jack Johnson beating Tommy Burns to become the first black World heavyweight champion. In his first editorial, Murray stated, "Boxing will stand for good clean sport. Its success or failure is in the hands of those who believe in sport of this character. Our energies will be devoted to giving the best paper that time, thought and money can devise." When circulation began to decline in the depression days of the late 1920s, the name of the magazine was changed to Boxing, Racing and Football.

In October 1931, the paper was sold to a syndicate of London sportsmen, who installed Sydney Rushton, a long-time London fight reporter, as the new editor. The layout changed, the page size was increased and Rushton proved less popular than Murray. The paper was again put up for sale and, while waiting for a buyer, the old features were reinstated and there was no official Editor.

Another set of sportsmen bought the paper and Godfrey Williams was named editor. He attempted to run Boxing as a newspaper, cutting popular features and reducing news stories down to the shortest possible length. The circulation quickly dropped to its lowest ever.

Billy Masters, a city printer and huge boxing fan, saved the paper, appointing W.H. Millier as the new editor. He completely reinvigorated the magazine, helped in no small measure by its first colour cover.

In 1935, Millier departed and the owner replaced him with Sydney Ackland, who had previously worked as John Murray's assistant editor and had been taught by him. World War II brought many changes as first Sydney, then replacement Stanley Nelson, contributed to the war effort. Murray made a popular comeback as editor but ill health forced him to step down in 1941. Gilbert Odd took over until the building housing the paper was destroyed by the enemy. Odd was then called up for national service and both Masters and Murray served further terms. Now with the new name of Boxing News, the paper was bought by Australian publicist Vivian Brodzky and former promoter Sydney Hulls. Northern sports writer Bert Callis was the new editor. Odd took over for a second term upon Callis’ retirement. Odd implemented the tradition of reporting the results and fighters' weights for every single fight in the country. When Odd quit to write books, he was succeeded by Jack Wilson and then Tim Riley. When Brodzky died, Boxing News was sold twice in quick succession, and Graham Houston became editor in 1971, immediately broadening the range of coverage, especially in North America. Houston left in 1977 to work on morning newspapers in Canada. This prompted the appointment of perhaps BN's greatest Editor of recent years, Harry Mullan. Circulation increased exponentially during the Mullan years, which doubled as a time of great change in the boxing world. Most notable new developments were the proliferation of ‘world’ titles and the increase in the number of major British promoters. Mullan was fiercely principled and tremendously well respected in the boxing fraternity. When Mullan left in October 1996, he was given this glowing tribute from then BN Publisher Peter Kravitz: "His writing stands comparison with the Lieblings, Hausers and Mailers of this century of boxing."

Assistant Editor Claude Abrams succeeded Mullan in November 1996. Boxing News was redesigned and switched to a full-colour format and become more extensive in content. In March 1999 the paper went to A3 size before reverting to A4, and increasing in size to 48 pages (from 24) in September 2005. The magazine remained the main trade paper in Britain. Abrams left BN – after 22 years – in December 2009, just three months after the publication celebrated its centenary, and was succeeded as editor by Tris Dixon.

Tris left the magazine in December 2014, with Matt Christie taking over as editor.

The magazine announced in 2021 that it would only recognize world champions as voted by the Transnational Boxing Rankings Board.

Sections of the paper
Shot of the Week: The very best in boxing photography from the previous week.
Editor's Letter: Matt's column tackling the big issues in boxing today.
Guest Column: This rotates but features Tyson Fury, Amir Khan and Joe Gallagher.
News: All the latest breaking stories and the background behind them. BN has recently spoken exclusively to, among others, Peter Fury, Frank Warren, David Haye, and Carl Frampton.
Action: Every British fight and most foreign ones too are covered, blow-by-blow. As the motto goes, ‘Every punch, every week, since 1909.’
Previews: Whetting your appetite for the big upcoming battles. With the all-important BN prediction. When a major fight occurs, it has been known for BN to also produce a 12-page supplement befitting the occasion. This was done for Manny Pacquiao v Floyd Mayweather and Carl Froch v George Groves.
Features: An in-depth look at pretty much anyone or anything to do with boxing. Recent features have focused on Mexican sensation Saul Alvarez, multi-weight world champion Miguel Cotto and Wladimir Klitschko. 
Q&A: A candid chat with one of boxing's current or former stars.
Fight Diary: Every upcoming fight listed.
Rankings: BN updates its world rankings for each weight division on a weekly basis.
Readers' letters: (those can get pretty spicy).
Amateurs: John Dennen's in-depth section on amateur boxing.
Vested Interest: Features with the personalities at the heart of the sport, including Nicola Adams and USA's first female Olympic boxing medallist Claressa Shields.
Amateur Scene: The very best action, previews and news from the unpaid ranks.
Fighting Fit: Advice on training, nutrition and technique. BN also produces special issues on these themes.
Flashback: Looking back at notable events in boxing history.
The 10 Count: The Top 10...there are so many, this will run and run.
60 Seconds: Boxers answer quickfire questions in our 60-second interview.
Heroes and Villains: The BN team give their take on the past week's occurrences.

Staff
Matt Christie (Editor)
Nick Bond (Art Editor): Nick pieces the magazine together, chooses photographs.
John Dennen (Online Editor)
Paul Wheeler (Assistant Editor)

References

External links
 Boxing News website

Boxing magazines
Sports magazines published in the United Kingdom
Weekly magazines published in the United Kingdom
Magazines established in 1909
1909 establishments in the United Kingdom
Boxing in the United Kingdom
Magazines published in London